"Goodbye" is the fourth single of the hip hop group Slaughterhouse from their album Welcome to: Our House, which was released on August 28, 2012. The song features Ming-Xia formally of The Spooks. The song features production by Boi-1da. It was available to purchase on iTunes on August 14, 2012.  There is a remix featuring Fat Joe, dedicated to Chris Lighty.

Music video 
A music video for the song was released on November 9, 2012 under VEVO on YouTube.

Track listing
Digital single

Notes
 signifies an additional producer.
 signifies a co-producer.

Release history

Charts

References 

2012 singles
Slaughterhouse (group) songs
Songs written by Royce da 5'9"
Song recordings produced by Boi-1da
Songs written by Boi-1da
2012 songs
Songs written by Joe Budden
Songs written by Joell Ortiz